Edvin Sigizmundovich Ozolin (born 12 February 1939) is a retired Soviet runner and athletics coach. He competed in various sprint events at the 1960 and 1964 Olympics and won a silver medal in the 4×100 m relay. He won four medals in the relay at the European championships in 1958 and 1966 and at the Summer Universiade in 1961 and 1965. Individually he won 200 m at the 1963 and 1965 Universiade.

Ozolin was born in Leningrad. He took up athletics in 1955 and soon became the best Soviet sprinter of the 1960s, winning 16 national titles: in the 100 m (1959–1963), 200 m (1960–1961 and 1963), 4×100 m relay (1957, 1961, 1965–1966, and 1968) and 200 m hurdles (1963 and 1967). Later he had a long career as a coach. In 1984–1992 he headed the Soviet sprinting and hurdling team and in 1992–2003 the Malaysian track and field team. He wrote several textbooks on sprint running.

References

1939 births
Living people
Athletes from Saint Petersburg
Latvian male sprinters
Soviet male sprinters
Olympic athletes of the Soviet Union
Olympic silver medalists for the Soviet Union
Athletes (track and field) at the 1960 Summer Olympics
Athletes (track and field) at the 1964 Summer Olympics
European Athletics Championships medalists
Burevestnik (sports society) athletes
Armed Forces sports society athletes
Medalists at the 1960 Summer Olympics
Olympic silver medalists in athletics (track and field)
Universiade medalists in athletics (track and field)
Universiade gold medalists for the Soviet Union
Universiade silver medalists for the Soviet Union
Medalists at the 1961 Summer Universiade
Medalists at the 1963 Summer Universiade
Medalists at the 1965 Summer Universiade